Spark commonly refers to:

 Spark (fire), a small glowing particle or ember
 Electric spark, a form of electrical discharge

Spark may also refer to:

Places
 Spark Point, a rocky point in the South Shetland Islands

People
 Spark (surname)
 Jessica Morgan (born 1992; formerly known as Spark), female singer-songwriter from East London

Companies and organisations
 Spark, the last-mile delivery service for Walmart
 Spark (architects), an international architectural firm
 Spark (U.S. organization), a Trotskyist group
 Spark Energy, a UK electricity and gas supplier
 Spark Infrastructure, an investor in Australian infrastructure assets
 Spark Networks SE, an online dating company
 Spark New Zealand, a telecommunications company
 Spark Racing Technology, a French motorsport manufacturer specializing in electric racecars
 Spark Unlimited, a computer game developer

Computer science
 Adobe Spark, a suite of media applications developed by Adobe Systems
 Apache Spark, a cluster computing framework
 Cisco Spark (application), a collaboration application and platform now part of the Webex Teams application
 Spark (application), a mobile email application for iOS devices by Readdle
 Spark (cellular automaton), a type of pattern in Conway's Game of Life and related rules
 SPARK (programming language), a variant of the Ada programming language which focuses on high integrity software
 Spark (software), a web application framework.
 Spark (XMPP client), an instant messaging client

Arts and entertainment
 Spark (radio show), a culture and technology program hosted for the Canadian Broadcasting Corporation
 Project Spark, a "game maker" video game

Books, comics and periodicals
 Spark*, the student newspaper of the University of Reading
 Spark (comics) or Ayla Ranzz, a member of the Legion of Super-Heroes
 Spark (magazine), the student newspaper of the Victorian College of the Arts Student Union, Australia
 Spark (Matayoshi novel), a 2015 novel by Naoki Matayoshi
 Spark (Twelve Hawks novel), a 2014 novel by John Twelve Hawks
 Spark, the student magazine of Lakota East High School, Ohio, U.S.
 Spark Mag, an online publication founded by the punk band Downtown Boys
 "Spark", in the comics series Girl Genius, a mad scientist with supernatural abilities

Film
 Spark (1998 film), a film starring Terrence Howard
 Spark: A Burning Man Story, a 2013 documentary film
 Spark (2014 film), a film directed by V. K. Singh
 Spark (2016 film), an animated film
 A Spark Story, a 2021 documentary film

Music
 Spark Records, a record label
 Spark Sunderland, a radio station in Sunderland, England

Albums
 Spark (Alain Johannes album), 2010
 Spark (Drake White album), 2016
 Spark (Hiromi album), 2016
 Spark (Marit Larsen album), 2011
 Spark (Thomas Leeb album), 2004
 The Spark (album), by Enter Shikari, 2017
 Spark (Whitney album), 2022
 The Spark, by Plankeye, 1995

Songs
 "Spark" (Amy Macdonald song), 2010
 "Spark" (Tori Amos song), 1998
 "Spark", by Assemblage 23 from Compass
 "Spark", by The Church from Starfish
 "The Spark" (song), by Afrojack

Television
 ABC Spark, a Canadian cable channel
 Hibana: Spark, a 2016 Japanese web series

Ships and submarines
 HMS Spark, a British Royal Navy submarine
 USS Spark (1813), a United States Navy brig ship
 USS Spark (1831), a United States Navy schooner
 , a United States Navy tank-landing ship

Other uses
 Divine spark, a Gnostic and esoteric concept
 Spark (horse)
 Spark (mathematics), the smallest number of linearly dependent columns in a matrix
 SPARK (anti-counterfeiting feature)
 SPARK (rocket), an American expendable launch system
 Spark-gap transmitter, a technology used to generate radio waves
 Spark or Sinthusa, a genus of butterfly
 Kicksled or spark, a small sled
 Chevrolet Spark
 TheSpark.com, website which originated SparkNotes
 Hangzhou Spark, a Chinese esports team in the Overwatch League

See also
 Iskra ("Spark"), a political newspaper of Russian socialist emigrants 1900-1905
 
 

 SPARC (disambiguation)
 Sparks (disambiguation)
 Sparq (disambiguation)
 Sparx (disambiguation)
 Sparkle (disambiguation)